The Society for the Study of Artificial Intelligence and Simulation of Behaviour or SSAISB or AISB is a nonprofit, scientific society devoted to advancing the scientific understanding of the mechanisms underlying thought and intelligent behaviour and their simulation and embodiment in machines. AISB also aims to facilitate co-operation and communication among those interested in the study of artificial intelligence, simulation of behaviour and the design of intelligent systems.

History
Founded in 1964, SSAISB, is the oldest AI society in the world. It is the largest Artificial Intelligence Society in the United Kingdom. The society has an international membership drawn from both academia and industry. It is a member of the European Association for Artificial Intelligence (previously known as European Coordinating Committee for Artificial Intelligence ECCAI).

Objectives of the Society

The objectives of the Society are:

 to promote the study of artificial intelligence, simulation of behaviour and the design of intelligent systems.
 to facilitate co-operation and communication among those interested in the study of artificial intelligence, simulation of behaviour and the design of intelligent systems.
 to hold, or to participate in the holding of, conferences and meetings for the communication of knowledge concerning, and to publicise and disseminate by other means knowledge and views concerning artificial intelligence, simulation of behaviour and the design of intelligent systems.

Activities of the Society

The society hosts an annual convention consisting of parallel symposia covering various specialist topics, loosely organised around a theme.
It also runs various events, especially to promote public understanding of AI and cognitive science.
The society published the journal AISBJ (no longer published) and continues to publish a quarterly newsletter AISBQ which includes short reports on current AI and cognitive science research.

External links
 SSAISB website
 Current and past SSAISB conventions
 SSAISB Journal
 SSAISB events
 List of SSAISB Fellows

Artificial intelligence associations
Computer science organizations
Organizations established in 1964